Marinobacterium is a genus of bacteria found in sea water. The cells are rod-shaped and are motile by using one polar flagellum. S.I. Paul et al. (2021) isolated, characterized and identified two species of Marinobacterium (Marinobacterium coralli, Marinobacterium maritimum) from marine sponges of the Saint Martin's Island Area of the Bay of Bengal, Bangladesh.

Biochemical characteristics of Marinobacterium 
Colony, morphological, physiological, and biochemical characteristics of Marinobacterium species are shown in the Table below.

Note: + = Positive; – =Negative; V =Variable (+/–)

References

External links
 Marinobacterium LPSN List of Prokaryotic names with Standing in Nomenclature

Alteromonadales
Bacteria genera